Enrico Erick Dueñas Hernández Bisschop (born 23 February 2001) is a professional footballer who plays as a forward for Spanish club Cartagena B. Born in the Netherlands, he represents the El Salvador national team.

Club career
Hernández is a youth product of Almere, Waterwijk, and Ajax before moving to Vitesse's youth academy in 2018. He made his professional debut with Vitesse in a 2–0 win over Willem II on 17 December 2020. The next day, on 18 December, Hernández signed his first professional contract with Vitesse for 2.5 years.

On August 4, it was announced that Hernandez extended his contract with Vitesse until 2024 and that he would be loaned out to Eerste Divisie club FC Eindhoven for one season. He was recalled by Vitesse in December 2021.

On 10 July 2022, Hernández moved to Cartagena B in Spain on a two-year deal.

International career
Hernández was eligible to represent Netherlands, Finland, El Salvador and Curaçao. He was born in the Netherlands to a Salvadoran father and Finnish mother, while his paternal grandfather is from Curaçao.

Hernández was called up to the El Salvador U-23 team on 8 March 2021 ahead of the CONCACAF Men's Olympic Qualifying Championship. He made his debut with the El Salvador U23s in a 2–0 loss to the Canada U23s on 19 March 2021. On 8 April 2021, it was revealed that Football Association of Finland contacted Hernandez with the hope that he would play for the Finland national football team. Hernandez declined, opting to represent El Salvador.

Hernández was named in El Salvador's preliminary 2021 CONCACAF Gold Cup roster but ultimately did not make the final cut; opting to focus on his club career with Vitesse. He made his senior debut for El Salvador on September 2, 2021, against the United States in their opening match of the final round of the 2022 FIFA World Cup qualifiers, entering as a substitute in a 0–0 draw at Estadio Cuscatlán. The next month on October 7, Hernández scored his first goal for El Salvador against Panama, netting the game-winner in a 1–0 victory.

International goals

References

External links
 
 Profile at Vitesse Jeugd
 Profile at Ons Oranje

2001 births
Living people
Footballers from Almere
Salvadoran footballers
El Salvador international footballers
El Salvador youth international footballers
Dutch footballers
Netherlands youth international footballers
Salvadoran people of Curaçao descent
Salvadoran people of Finnish descent
Dutch people of Curaçao descent
Dutch people of Finnish descent
Dutch people of Salvadoran descent
Association football forwards
SBV Vitesse players
FC Eindhoven players
FC Cartagena B players
Eredivisie players
Eerste Divisie players
Citizens of El Salvador through descent
Salvadoran expatriate footballers
Expatriate footballers in Spain
Salvadoran expatriate sportspeople in Spain